Andrew Cook may refer to:
Andrew F. Cook, Jr. (1920–1942), U.S. Marine Corps officer killed at the Battle of Guadalcanal
Andrew Cook (businessman) (born 1949), chairman of William Cook Group
Andrew Cook (author), British author
Andrew Cook (footballer), footballer in 2010–11 East Fife F.C. season
Andrew Cook, musician in Stapleton
Andrew Cook, a character in Dr. Quinn, Medicine Woman played by Brandon Douglas
Andy Cook (footballer, born 1990), English footballer

See also
Andy Cook (disambiguation)
Andrew Cooke (disambiguation)